Moorburg is a place in Hamburg, Germany in the quarter Harburg. Flora and fauna: Altes Land.

References 

Quarters of Hamburg
Harburg, Hamburg